The Seed and the Sower is a book by South African writer Laurens van der Post, consisting of three interrelated stories blended into a novel, first published in 1963. The novel was filmed in 1983 as Merry Christmas, Mr. Lawrence, directed by Nagisa Oshima and starring David Bowie, Tom Conti, Ryuichi Sakamoto and Takeshi Kitano.

Plot
The first story is set in a Japanese Prisoner of War camp in Java during World War II and is a first person account of the relationship between John Lawrence, a British officer, and Sergeant Hara, one of the camp’s senior guards. This segment was initially published as a short story in 1956 as A Bar of Shadow.

The second, lengthier story is also set in the P.O.W. camp but is narrated in the third person from the diary of Major Celliers, a South African officer serving in the British Army, who perished in the camp and his relationships with his disabled brother and with the camp commandant, Captain Yonoi. Both of the first two stories attempt to convey the conflicting feelings the principal characters felt towards each other and their attempts to understand each other’s cultures and their widely opposed codes of honour.

The final segment is Lawrence’s reminiscence of a brief affair with a woman whose name he never learned, shortly before his capture by the Japanese.

Film adaptation
 Merry Christmas Mr. Lawrence

Reviews
 https://www.kirkusreviews.com/book-reviews/laurens-van-der-post-6/the-seed-and-the-sower-2/
http://litmed.med.nyu.edu/Annotation?action=view&annid=11760

References

1963 novels
Novels set during World War II
Novels set in Indonesia
South African novels adapted into films
Hogarth Press books
Japan in non-Japanese culture